Erling Adell "Swede" Larsen (November 15, 1913 – October 8, 2005) was a second baseman in Major League Baseball. He played for the Boston Bees in 1936.

References

External links

1913 births
2005 deaths
Major League Baseball second basemen
Boston Bees players
Baseball players from Jersey City, New Jersey
Colgate Raiders baseball players